ASG Baseball is a board game published in 1973 by 3W.

Contents
ASG Baseball is a game in which the game system involves D20 die rolls cross referenced against player stats.

Reception
The Hamilton JournalNews said "the game definitely shows promise. If you plan to simply spend one evening by playing a game with a friend, ASG ranks high on the basis of enjoyment."

Ellis Simpson reviewed ASG Baseball for Games International magazine, and gave it 4 stars out of 5, and stated that "Like many baseball games there is much more work and research than a few pieces of paper can hold. The man hours involved in this project must have been enormous. The end result is a game that baseball fans and sports gamers and will love. No ifs, or buts."

References

3W games
Board games introduced in 1973